Newlyn (: Lu 'fleet', Lynn/Lydn 'pool') is a seaside town and fishing port (the largest fishing port in England) in south-west Cornwall, UK.

Newlyn lies on the shore of Mount's Bay and forms a small conurbation with the neighbouring town of Penzance. It is part of the Penzance civil parish. The principal industry is fishing, although there are also a variety of yachts and pleasure boats in the harbour, as Newlyn has become a popular holiday destination with pubs and restaurants. Although the parish is now listed under Penzance there is an electoral ward in separate existence called Newlyn and Mousehole. The population as of the 2011 census was 4,432.

Toponymy
The settlement is recorded as Nulyn in 1279 and as Lulyn in 1290, and the name is thought to be derived from the Cornish for "pool for a fleet of boats" which is thought to refer to the shallows offshore known as Gwavas Lake, traditionally the principal mooring for the fishing fleet in the area.

History
Before the rise of Newlyn as an important settlement the landing rights and most properties within the Newlyn area were owned by the Manor of Alverton. Newlyn's history has been strongly linked to its role as a major fishing port. The natural protection afforded by the Gwavas Lake (an area of seawater in Mount's Bay) led to many local fishermen using this area as a preferred landing site.

The Spanish Raid of 1595 destroyed Penzance, Mousehole and Paul as well as Newlyn.

In 1620 the Mayflower stopped off at Newlyn old quay to take on water. A plaque on the quay reads:

The sea rose ten feet in ten minutes at Newlyn, and ebbed at the same rate. The 19th-century French writer, Arnold Boscowitz, claimed that "great loss of life and property occurred upon the coasts of Cornwall".

Before the 19th century, "Newlyn" referred only to the area near the old quay. The part of the village that now contains the fish market was known as "Streetanowan", this was separated at high tide from "Newlyn Town" the site of the lower part of the modern harbour being reclaimed land and formerly a beach. In fact Newlyn comprises three discrete hamlets all previously separated by bodies of water, being Tolcarne (Tal Carn: Brow of the Rocks), Street-an-owan (Street-an-Owan: Oxen Street) and Trewarveneth (Farm/Manor on the Hill).

Newlyn (like Mousehole) was part of the ancient parish of Paul. It was common for villagers to climb the relatively steep route from "Newlyn Cliff" to Paul via the area which is now known as Gwavas to worship at Paul Church. Until the mid-20th century an ancient stone cross was present on this route at "Park an Grouse" (The Field of the Cross), this cross was one site of veneration of the Cornish sea deity Bucca, (others were the beaches of Newlyn and Mousehole) the name 'Bucca' has often been used as a nickname for people who reside in Newlyn: the location of the cross is now unknown.

In 1851 Newlyn became the separate ecclesiastical parish of Newlyn St Peter. The church of St Peter was built in the Early English style in 1859–66. The interior is embellished with various works of art including the altarpiece and a statue of the Madonna and Child (by the then vicar the Rev. Allan G. Wyon). "The ensemble is an outstanding example of Anglo-Catholic embellishment of the period [1936–55]" (Peter Beacham). Father Wyon was the vicar from 1936 until his retirement in 1955. There is a Cornish cross by the road near the churchyard; it was found at Trereiffe about 1870 and much later placed near the church by the Rev. W. S. Lach-Szyrma.

In the 1880s a number of artists moved to the town and formed an artists' colony. The painters of Newlyn came to be known as the Newlyn School.

In 1896 Newlyn was the scene of the Newlyn riots following protests over the landing of fish on a Sunday by fishermen from the North of England, the local Cornish fishermen being members of the Methodist church and as such strong supporters of sabbatarianism.

From 1915, the Ordnance Survey tidal observatory was established in the harbour and for the next six years measurements of tidal height were taken every 15 minutes. This tidal gauge data was used to calculate the mean sea level at Newlyn, Ordnance Datum Newlyn, which became the vertical datum the Ordnance Survey uses to map altitudes throughout Great Britain.

In 1937, the fishing vessel Rosebud sailed to London to deliver a petition to the Minister of Health on behalf of those villagers whose homes were threatened under the government's slum clearance scheme.

During the Second World War Newlyn was a base for the Air Sea Rescue craft covering the Western Approaches. The harbour was bombed during the war, hitting the collier Greenhithe, which was beached in the harbour at the time and supplied coal to the east coast drifters, which travelled to Newlyn during the mackerel fishing season between the wars. Reporting the event on the "Germany Calling" propaganda broadcast Lord Haw-Haw announced that the Luftwaffe had sunk a British cruiser in Newlyn Harbour.

The 2014 LP Cornish Pop Songs by indie band the Hit Parade contains several songs referencing Newlyn fishing industry including "The Ghost of the Fishing Fleet", a comment on the declining investment in the area, neglect by central government and the recent influx in tourist trade.

Newlyn and the Cornish language
Newlyn, along with nearby Mousehole and Paul, was the last stronghold of the Cornish language, presumably due to the strength of its fishing fleet. William Gwavas, James Jenkins, Nicholas Boson, Thomas Boson, John Boson, John Keigwin, and John Kelynack Jnr had roots in or strong links with the district. Subsequently, several antiquarians including Prince Louis Lucien Bonaparte, Daines Barrington, Georg Sauerwein and Henry Jenner who all collected Cornish writings or sayings, and the latter two became proficient in its use.

Local government
In 1894 Newlyn became part of Paul Urban District, while Tolcarne on the eastern side of the stream was in Madron Urban District. The urban districts were abolished in 1934 and Newlyn and Tolcarne were absorbed into the municipal borough of Penzance. Penzance Municipal Borough was itself abolished in 1974 under the Local Government Act 1972, and Newlyn became part of the new Penwith District. The former borough was unparished until 1980. The unparished area was formed into a civil parish in 1980, and the new Penzance parish council chose to call itself a town council. Newlyn returns five councillors to Penzance Town Council. Penwith District was abolished in 2009, and Newlyn now falls under the unitary Cornwall Council, with the town being shared between two divisions, Penzance Promenade in the east and Newlyn and Mousehole in the west.

Geography
Newlyn is located in western Cornwall, just south of Penzance. It lies along the B3315 road which connects it to Land's End. Paul and Mousehole lie to the south.

The Ordnance Survey, the United Kingdom's mapping agency, bases all elevations including mapped contour lines and spot heights on the mean sea level at Newlyn (see Ordnance Datum). The mean sea level data was calculated from hourly readings of the sea level between 1 May 1915 and 30 April 1921.

Economy

Newlyn's economy is largely dependent on its harbour and the associated fishing industry; Newlyn Harbour is the largest fishing port in England. The port was a major catcher of pilchard until the 1960s. Today, a few vessels have resumed pilchard fishing and use a modern version of the ring net. The largest vessels are beam trawlers owned by W Stevenson and Sons Ltd, one of Cornwall's largest fish producers; most of the other vessels are owned by their skippers. The company based in the Old Pilchard Works today are major supplies of Cornish sardines and mixed-species fish. The fishing industry is hard work and markets are seasonably variable; Lamorna Ash experienced it for herself.

Sport
Newlyn RFC was formed in 1894 (or 1895) by the curate of St Peter's Church, the Rev Fred Peel Yates. The club amalgamated with Penzance RFC in 1944 to form Penzance and Newlyn RFC (The Pirates), currently known as the Cornish Pirates.

Newlyn Non-Athletico FC was formed in 1990 by a group of friends playing on Sunday mornings. They initially played in the West Penwith League, before joining the Mining League in 2002 and the Trelawny League in 2011. The club is nicknamed 'The Crab Army' due to Newlyn's fishing links, as well as the red crab featured on the club crest. The club plays its home games at Penzance Leisure Centre. The ground is affectionately known as 'The Santa Clara Stadium', or 'The Aquarium'.

Food and music festival
Newlyn is home to the Newlyn fish festival which hosts live music, cooking demonstrations, and various marquees selling local produce.

Notable landmarks
The UK National Tidal and Sea Level Facility (NTSLF) maintains a tidal observatory at Newlyn, and the UK Fundamental Benchmark is maintained there.

Newlyn was made famous in the 1880s and 1890s for its Newlyn School artists' colony, including the painters Thomas Cooper Gotch, Albert Chevallier Tayler and Henry Scott Tuke. The current largest collection of work by the Newlyn School is held by Penlee House Gallery and Museum in nearby Penzance. A collection of Newlyn Copper, produced from circa 1890–1920, is on view at Penlee House. Newlyn is the home of Newlyn Art Gallery which houses a collection of modern art.

Notable residents
Ray Atkins, artist
Richard Cook, artist
Stanhope Forbes, artist
Sir Terry Frost, artist
Thomas Cooper Gotch, painter
Robert Hichens, one of six quartermasters on board RMS Titanic and was at the ship's wheel when the ship struck the iceberg
Charles Holroyd, painter
W. S. Lach-Szyrma, clergyman and scholar
William Lovett, political agitator
Jack Nowell, rugby player
John Pearson, coppersmith
Brenda Wootton, singer
Allan G. Wyon, artist
Mark Jenkin, filmmaker
Harvey Williams, musician

See also

 Penlee Quarry railway
 Newlyn Copper

References

External links
 Information on the regeneration of Newlyn Harbour and connected organisations
 Information on the contemporary Newlyn School of Art an Arts Council funded not for profit organisation
 
 NTSLF page about the Newlyn Tidal Observatory and the Fundamental Benchmark

 
Towns in Cornwall
Ports and harbours of Cornwall
Fishing communities in England
Populated coastal places in Cornwall
Penwith